Paradise Group of Industries (PGI) is a Bangladeshi conglomerate. The company was founded by Mosharraf Hossain in 1983. The industries under this conglomerate include light engineering, electrical cable, textile, real estate, etc. Its main corporate units are Paradise Cable Limited (PCL), SBS Cables Ltd and Paradise Spinning Mills Ltd. Paradise Cables is the leading manufacturer of all types of wires, cables and conductors in Bangladesh. The group started its business with textiles and trading, and later diversified into wire and cable manufacturing.

List of companies
 Paradise Cables Limited
 SBS Cables Ltd.
 Paradise Spinning Mills Limited
 Paradise Fashions (Pvt) Ltd
 Paradise Merchandising Limited
 Paradise Marketing Limited
 Saleha Wire Limited
 Paradise Metallurgical Complex Ltd.
 Paradise Properties Limited
 Paradise Electric and Electronics Ltd

References

External links
 PGI corporate information

Conglomerate companies of Bangladesh